Wilson Street may refer to:
 Wilson Street (Glasgow, Scotland)
 Wilson Street (Hamilton, Ontario)